The 1942 Ecuador earthquake or the Guayaquil earthquake occurred on 13 May at 9:06 or 9:13 pm local time with a moment magnitude of  7.9. The temblor struck the coastal (Esmeraldas) region of Manabí Province, Ecuador. It caused damage mainly to cities like Guayaquil, Portoviejo and Guaranda. More than 300 people were killed and the total cost of damage was about US$2.5 million (1942 rate). Ecuador's largest city Guayaquil was the most affected despite the significant distantce from the epicenter. Many reinforced concrete structures in a particular area in the city were completely destroyed, contributing to fatalities.

Tectonic setting
The Nazca Plate dives beneath the South American Plate along a convergent plate boundary stretching from Colombia to Chile in a process known as subduction. This plate boundary occasionally produces large megathrust earthquakes along the west coast of South America. The Ecuador–Colombia subduction zone occupies part of this plate boundary, where the convergence rate is between 5 and 8 cm/yr. As the plates converge, elastic energy is stored at the subduction zone where friction between the plates locks them in place. Once the strain at the subduction is too great, the plates slip and the subduction zone ruptures in an earthquake.

Earthquake

The earthquake struck with a hypocenter depth of 20 km, and an epicenter about 15 km west of Pedernales at 02:13 a.m. local time. The capital Quito was located some 165 km from the epicenter of the quake. It was one of the largest in the country. The approximate epicentral location of the 1942 quake is calculated at the northern flanks of the Carnegie Ridge. In a period of 22 seconds, the seismic moment of the rupture was released in one simple event. Based on the relocation of the aftershocks, and examining the distribution, the earthquake had ruptured a 200 km by 90 km section of the subduction zone. 

It is the first event in a sequence of large earthquakes that would re-rupture the subduction zone. Subsequent events would follow-up in 1958, 1979 and 1998. The recent 2016 event was a repeat of the 1942 earthquake. This was similar to what was observed in Sumatra, Indonesia in the beginning of the 21st century with multiple earthquakes rupturing the Sunda subduction zone rather than in one large event.

The earthquakes of 1942 and 2016 are part of a cycle of repeated events with an average recurrence interval period of 74 years, indicating the next event may occur in 2090.

Effects
Ecuador's largest city Guayaquil suffered the worst during the earthquake despite being at least 250 km from the epicenter. More than 100 lives lost, and numerous high-rise collapses. Damage was also observed in Manabí, Guayas, Los Ríos, Esmeraldas, Bolívar and Imbabura.

In general, moderate damage was reported in the Guayaquil; much of the city experienced intensity VI–VII (Strong–Very strong) shaking on the Modified Mercalli intensity scale. However, in the city center, a post-disaster survey found heavy damage to reinforced concrete structures that corresponded to intensity VIII–IX (Severe–Violent). Countless buildings including cinemas and theaters were destroyed or damaged. In this zone of high intensity, one reinforced concrete building completely collapsed while another was almost completely destroyed. Three tall reinforced concrete structures and a number of buildings single or double story-tall suffered a complete collapse. One building that housed a clinic on the first floor crumbled to the ground, killing 29 individuals. Three additional structures had beams on their first floors so badly rendered that supports had to be installed immediately before they could be repaired or demolished. The location where the strongest intensity was felt in Guayaquil is just west of the Guayas River, and south of Cerro Del Carmen. The reason for the sudden violent shaking in this part of the city was attributed to its local geology;the city is built on water-saturated clay and alluvium deposited by the Guayas River. This local geological setting amplified seismic waves as it propagated which worsened the strength of strong ground motion in the city.

Further heavy damage was reported in the cities of Chone, Portoviejo, Manta, Junín, Calcetan and Pedernales. In the Naranjal Canton, large fissures formed in the ground which allowed a "foamy liquid" to erupt. Many homes and buildings situated along the coast were seriously damaged or destroyed. Shaking was felt as far as the Oriente region in the east, and the border towns of Colombia in the north.

After the mainshock, two strong aftershocks rocked the coast of Ecuador, causing more panic. Many surviving residents decided to live in the streets during the night for fear of further damage to their homes.

Tsunami
A moderate tsunami was reported along the coast. It resulted in minor damage but a few fatalities were reported.

See also
 List of earthquakes in 1942
 List of earthquakes in Ecuador

References

1942 earthquakes
1942 tsunamis
Earthquakes in Ecuador
Earthquakes in Colombia
1942 in Ecuador
1942 in Colombia
May 1942 events
Manabí Province
Guayaquil
Esmeraldas Province
Tsunamis in Colombia
Tsunamis in Ecuador
1942 disasters in South America